The Mayfield Fortification is a historic American Civil War earthworks at 8401 Quarry Road in Manassas, Virginia.  It is one of a series of fortifications constructed by the Confederate Army to defend the critical Manassas railroad junction in 1861.  The fort consisted of earthworks with log revetments, and was built by local Confederate troops and slave labor.  After 1862 the fort was sporadically occupied by Union forces.

The site was listed on the National Register of Historic Places in 1989.  It is now a city park.

See also
National Register of Historic Places listings in Manassas, in Manassas Park, and in Prince William County, Virginia

References

Buildings and structures in Manassas, Virginia
Forts in Virginia
Virginia municipal and county parks
Military installations established in 1861
American Civil War on the National Register of Historic Places
Military facilities on the National Register of Historic Places in Virginia
National Register of Historic Places in Manassas, Virginia
1861 establishments in Virginia
Tourist attractions in Manassas, Virginia